Siddheshwar is a village development committee in Bhojpur District in the Kosi Zone of eastern Nepal. At the time of the 1991 Nepal census it had a population of 3390 persons living in 630 individual households. Two major bazaars are Dama on the northwest ridge, where the secondary school is located, and Mandre in the eastern valley where the middle school is located.

References

External links
UN map of the municipalities of Bhojpur District

Populated places in Bhojpur District, Nepal
Bhojpur Municipality